Nathan David Wilson (born 1978) is an American author of young adult fiction.

Background
Wilson is the son of Calvinist minister Douglas Wilson and author Nancy Wilson. He was named after the biblical figures Nathan and David, and was educated at Logos School.

In sixth grade, Wilson decided that he wanted to become a writer, but he did not do any lengthy fiction writing until some years later. Wilson graduated from New Saint Andrews College in 1999. He studied theology through Liberty University from 1999 to 2000, and he received a master's degree in liberal arts from St. John's College in 2001.

During his graduate studies, Wilson began to work seriously toward writing children's fantasy. Of his first (unpublished) novel, "The Seventh Sneeze," he would later joke, "The title was the best thing about it." Wilson abandoned that project and launched a second attempt, which would ultimately become his 100 Cupboards series.

Wilson began teaching at New Saint Andrews College as an adjunct professor in 2001. In 2005, he was named a Fellow of Literature at the college. The same year, Wilson announced in Books & Culture magazine that he had made a near-duplicate of the Shroud of Turin image by exposing dark linen to the sun for ten days under a sheet of glass on which a positive mask had been painted, and in doing so, "caused some uproar in the Shroud of Turin world."

Along with writing and teaching, Wilson currently serves as the managing editor for Credenda/Agenda magazine.

Wilson is married. He and his wife Heather  have five children.

In 2017, Wilson underwent surgery to remove a brain tumor.

Writings

Wilson has written that his fictional writing is characterized by its creative allusions to classic literature. Leepike Ridge uses themes from The Odyssey, The Adventures of Tom Sawyer, and King Solomon's Mines, while the 100 Cupboards series was influenced by the King Arthur stories, both as told by Geoffrey of Monmouth and by Edmund Spenser in The Faerie Queene, and fairy tales from Robert Kirk and Sir Walter Scott. The Ashtown Burials series includes many historical and mythological characters (including Gilgamesh), and the first book in that series, The Dragon's Tooth, refigures elements from the opening chapters of Treasure Island. Boys of Blur, meanwhile, mirrors Beowulf—despite being set in the Florida Everglades.

He also wrote that the themes that runs through his books is fatherhood, and how to deal with fatherlessness by finding fathers.

Books

Wilson's 100 Cupboards trilogy, published by Yearling, is the story of Henry York, a boy who finds his way to other worlds through the cupboards in the attic of his uncle's Kansas house.

The first volume in another Wilson series, The Ashtown Burials, was released in August 2011. The Dragon's Tooth is the story of orphaned siblings Cyrus, Antigone, and Daniel, who become involved in a secret society of explorers after their late parents' motel burns down. The second and third books in the series, "The Drowned Vault" and "Empire of Bones," continue their story, describing Cyrus, Antigone, and Daniel's struggle against two sets of villains—invincible transmortals on one hand and a demented genetic engineer on the other. The series will comprise four novels.

Film
A "bookumentary" film adaptation of Notes from the Tilt-a-Whirl, narrated by Wilson, was released on DVD in 2011.

N.D. Wilson also wrote and filmed a movie called The River Thief. The movie was released to theaters in 2016, starring Joel Courtney.

Television

Other writings
Wilson's short fiction and prose have been published in Credenda/Agenda, the Chattahoochee Review, the Esquire napkin project, Christianity Today, and  Books & Culture.

Critical reception

Wilson's writings have received mostly positive reviews. Kirkus Reviews said of The 100 Cupboards, "Wilson’s writing is fantastical, but works with clever sentences and turns of phrase that render it more than just another rote fantasy."

Bibliography

100 Cupboards series 

 .
 .
 .
 .

Ashtown Burials series 

 .
 .
 .

Outlaws of Time series 

 .
 .
 .

Other children's fiction

 .
 .

Christian apologetics

 .
 .

Parody

 .
 .

Picture books

 .
 .
.
.
.

Textbooks
.

References

External links 
 .
 .
 .
 .
 .

21st-century American novelists
American children's writers
American fantasy writers
American male novelists
Calvinist and Reformed writers
Living people
People from Moscow, Idaho
St. John's College (Annapolis/Santa Fe) alumni
1978 births
New Saint Andrews College faculty
New Saint Andrews College alumni
21st-century American male writers